FC Khimik Belorechensk was a Russian football team from Belorechensk. It played professionally from 1989 to 1994. Its best result was 3rd place in the Zone 1 of the Russian Second Division in 1992.

Team name history
 1989 – MTsOP Khimik Belorechensk
 1990–1994 – FC Khimik Belorechensk
 1997–2000 – FC Dynamo Belorechensk
 2001 – FC Khimik Belorechensk

External links
  Team history at KLISF

Association football clubs established in 1989
Association football clubs disestablished in 2002
Defunct football clubs in Russia
Sport in Krasnodar Krai
1989 establishments in Russia
2002 disestablishments in Russia